Rivière du Sud may refer to:

Canada
 Rivière du Sud (Montmagny), a tributary of the south shore of the Saint Lawrence River in Montmagny Regional County Municipality, Chaudière-Appalaches, Quebec
 Rivière du Sud-Ouest (Saint Lawrence River tributary), a tributary on the south shore of the Saint Lawrence River in Bas-Saint-Laurent, Quebec
 Rivière du Sud (Richelieu River tributary) in Le Haut-Richelieu Regional County Municipality, Montérégie, Quebec
 Rivière du Sud-Ouest (Yamaska River tributary), in Montérégie, Quebec
 Rivière du Sud (La Sarre River tributary), in Abitibi-Ouest Regional County Municipality, Abitibi-Témiscamingue, Quebec